Viva Tour (En Vivo) is the second live album by Mexican singer Thalía. It was released on November 12, 2013 by Sony Music Mexico in Mexico and was released in the United States on December 1, 2013 by Sony Music Latin and later on globally by Sony Music Entertainment. The album was released as a full concert on the following formats : CD + DVD, DVD and Blu-ray Disc. The DVD format includes also a behind-the-scenes documentary about Thalia's preparation for the tour. The concert was recorded on April 26 and 27, 2013 at the National Auditorium of Mexico City, during the tour's last concerts.

Commercial performance 
In Mexico, after 15 days of its released reached the Gold status for sales of over 30,000 copies.

DVD track listing
"Atmósfera" 
Qué Será De Ti
"Tómame O Déjame"
"Habítame Siempre"
 Medley
"Cómo"
"Enséñame A Vivir"
"Con Los Años Que Me Quedan" (performed with Leonel García, Samo and Jesús Navarro of Reik)
"No Soy El Aire"
"Hoy Ten Miedo De Mí"
"Manías"
"Mujeres" (performed with María José)
"Equivocada"
 Medley Novelas
"Quinceañera"
"Rosalinda"
"Marimar"
"María La Del Barrio"
"La Apuesta" (performed with Erik Rubín)
 Medley NY
"No Me Enseñaste" (Remix)
"Tú Y Yo (Remix)"
"Entre El Mar Y Una Estrella" (Pablo Flores Club Mix)
"Piel Morena (Remix)"
"Amor A La Mexicana"
 Medley Hits
"Seducción"
"¿A Quién Le Importa?"
"Arrasando"

CD track listing

"Atmósfera" 
Qué Será De Ti
"Tómame O Déjame"
"Habítame Siempre"
 Medley
"Cómo"
"Enséñame A Vivir"
"Con Los Años Que Me Quedan" (performed with Leonel García, Samo and Jesús Navarro of Reik)
"No Soy El Aire"
"Hoy Ten Miedo De Mí"
"Manías"
"Mujeres" (performed with María José)
"Equivocada"
 Medley Novelas
"Quinceañera"
"Rosalinda"
"Marimar"
"María La Del Barrio"
"La Apuesta" (performed with Erik Rubín)
 Medley NY
"No Me Enseñaste" (Remix)
"Tú Y Yo (Remix)"
"Entre El Mar Y Una Estrella" (Pablo Flores Club Mix)
"Piel Morena" (Remix)"
"Amor A La Mexicana"
 Medley Hits
"Seducción"
"¿A Quién Le Importa?"
"Arrasando"

Charts

Weekly charts

Year-end charts

Certifications and sales

Release history

References

Thalía live albums
2013 live albums
2013 video albums
Spanish-language live albums
Spanish-language video albums
Sony Music Latin live albums
Live video albums
Thalía video albums
Sony Music Latin video albums
Albums recorded at the Auditorio Nacional (Mexico)